Greet Grottendieck (born 22 February 1943 in The Hague) is a Dutch sculptor.

Greet moved to the Veluwe in 1965. She makes sculptures from people and animals. 

Her work can be seen in various cities and villages in the Netherlands.

External links
 Greetbeeldeninbrons.nl

1943 births
Living people
Dutch sculptors
Dutch women sculptors
Artists from The Hague
20th-century Dutch women artists
21st-century Dutch women artists